Alathur taluk is a taluk in Perambalur district in the Indian state of Tamil Nadu. It was created by former chief minister J.Jayalalithaa for issues of population increase. Kunnam taluk was bifurcated to form this new taluk.

Villages
There are 39 villages in Alathur taluk excluding the headquarters Alathur.

References

Perambalur district
Taluks of Perambalur district